The Arabah, Araba or Aravah (hāʿĂrāḇā; , Wādī ʿAraba; lit. "desolate and dry area") is a loosely defined geographic area south of the Dead Sea basin, which forms part of the border between Israel to the west and Jordan to the east.

The old meaning, which was in use up to the early 20th century, covered almost the entire length of what today is called the Jordan Rift Valley, running in a north–south orientation between the southern end of the Sea of Galilee and the northern tip of the Gulf of Aqaba of the Red Sea at Aqaba–Eilat. This included the Jordan River Valley between the Sea of Galilee and the Dead Sea, the Dead Sea itself, and what today is commonly called the Arava Valley. The contemporary use of the term is restricted to this southern section alone.

Geography

Topographically, the region is divided into three sections.

The Arabah is scenic with colorful cliffs and sharp-topped mountains. The southern Arabah is hot and dry and virtually without rain.

Flora and fauna
There are numerous species of flora and fauna in the Aravah Valley.<ref>Henry Chichester Hart. 1891, Some account of the fauna and flora of Sinai, Petra, and Wâdy Arabah, 255 pages</ref> Notably the caracal (Caracal caracal'') is found on the valley's savanna areas.

Important Bird Areas
A  tract of the northern Arava Valley, from the Ne'ot Hakikar Nature Reserve in the north to the Hazeva and Shezaf Nature Reserve in the south, has been recognised as an Important Bird Area (IBA) by BirdLife International because it supports populations of both resident and migrating bird species, including sand partridges, garganeys, common cranes, black and white storks, Eurasian spoonbills and bitterns, black-winged stilts, desert tawny owls, lappet-faced vultures, Levant sparrowhawks, sooty falcons, Arabian warblers and babblers, Tristram's starlings, hooded wheatears and Dead Sea sparrows.
 
Furthermore, a  tract of the southern Arava Valley, from Yotvata in the north to the Gulf of Aqaba in the south, including the western (Israeli) half of the valley floor and the ridge of the Eilat Mountains, has also been recognised as an IBA, with additional significant species being Lichtenstein's sandgrouse, grey herons, great white pelicans, slender-billed curlews, marsh sandpipers, black-winged pratincoles, white-eyed gulls, white-winged terns, pallid scops owls, European honey buzzards, Egyptian vultures, eastern imperial eagles, lesser kestrels, lanner falcons, Arabian larks, Sinai rosefinches and cinereous buntings. An additional species recorded there is the vulnerable MacQueen's bustard, in very small numbers.

History

In Biblical times, the Arava was a center of copper production; King Solomon is believed to have had mines here based on copper mines dating to his reign. Copper mining at the Ashalim site even predates his reign.  The Arabah, especially its eastern part, was part of the realm of the Edomites (called "Idumeans" during Roman times). Later the eastern Arabah became the domain of the Nabateans, the builders of the city of Petra.

The Israel–Jordan Peace Treaty was signed in the Arava on October 26, 1994. The governments of Jordan and Israel are promoting development of the region. There is a plan to bring sea water from the Red Sea to the Dead Sea through a canal (Red–Dead Seas Canal), which follows along the Arabah. This (long envisioned) project was once an issue of dispute between Jordan and Israel, but it was recently agreed that the project shall be constructed on and by the Jordanian side.

Archaeology: Kingdom of Edom
The existence of the biblical Kingdom of Edom was proved by archaeologists led by Ezra Ben-Yosef and Tom Levy, using a methodology called the punctuated equilibrium model in 2019. Archaeologists mainly took copper samples from the Timna Valley and Faynan in Jordan's Arava valley dated to 1300–800 BCE. According to the results of the analyses, the researchers thought that Pharaoh Shoshenk I of Egypt (the Biblical "Shishak"), who attacked Jerusalem in the 10th century BC, encouraged trade and production of copper instead of destroying the region. Tel Aviv University professor Ben-Yosef reported “Our new findings contradict the view of many archaeologists that the Arava was populated by a loose alliance of tribes, and they’re consistent with the biblical story that there was an Edomite kingdom here”.

Demography
In 2004, the Jordanian administrative district of Wadi Araba had a population of 6,775. Five major tribes comprise eight settlements on the Jordanian side: Al-S'eediyeen, Al-Ihewat, Al-Ammareen, Al-Rashaideh, and Al-Azazmeh, as well as smaller tribes of the Al-Oseifat, Al-Rawajfeh, Al-Manaja'h, and Al-Marzaqa, among others. The main economic activities for these Arabah residents revolve around herding sheep, agriculture, handicrafts, and the Jordanian Army.

Landmarks

Timna Valley Park is notable for its prehistoric rock carvings, some of the oldest copper mines in the world, and a convoluted cliff called King Solomon's pillars. On the Jordanian side is  Wadi Rum, famous among rock climbers, hikers, campers, and lovers of the outdoors. There is the Jordanian copper mining area of Wadi Feynan, including the site of Khirbat en-Nahas, corresponding to the one from Timna Valley in the west.

Feynan Ecolodge was opened in Wadi Feynan by the Royal Society for the Conservation of Nature in 2005.

Jordanian localities
Below is a list of Jordanian population clusters in Wadi Araba:

Aqaba
Feifa
Safi
Al Mazraa

The total Jordanian population in the region is 103,000, of whom 96,000 live in Aqaba.

Israeli localities
Below is a list of Israeli localities in the Arava, from north to south.

Ein Tamar
Neot HaKikar
Ir Ovot
Idan
Ein Hatzeva
Hatzeva
Ein Yahav 
Sapir
Tzofar

Tzukim
Paran
Yahel
Neot Smadar
Neve Harif
Kibbutz Lotan
Ketura
Grofit

Kibbutz Yotvata
Samar
Elifaz
Be'er Ora
Eilot
Eilat

The Israeli population of the region is 52,000, of whom 47,500 live in Eilat, and just over 5,000 live in 20 small towns north of Eilat, the largest of which is Yotvata, with a population (as of 2019) of 717.

See also
 Arava Institute for Environmental Studies, academic program in Israel
 Nahal HaArava, a wadi in the northern part of the Arava
 Negev
 Sands of Samar, an expanse of sand dunes in the southern Arava
 Southern District (Israel)
 Wadi Araba Crossing, southernmost border crossing between Jordan and Israel

References

External links

WadiFeynan Eco-Lodge
The Arava Institute for Environmental Studies
Royal Society for the Conservation of Nature
Wadi Araba Archaeological Research Project: Integrating Investigations of the Cultural Landscape of Wadi Araba since 1996. For Publications, see http://wadiaraba.tripod.com/waarpubs.htm
Wadi Arabah Project: Crossing the Rift
 French Institute of Oriental Archaeology
Photos of Wadi â€˜Araba at the American Center of Research

Deserts of Israel
Deserts of Jordan
Great Rift Valley
Israel–Jordan relations
Edom
Important Bird Areas of Israel
Important Bird Areas of Jordan